Endaze  is a defunct measurement unit of length used in the Ottoman Empire.

Endaze means pace. But it is shorter than the pace. It was equal to 65.25 cm. It was usually used in the silk trade. Its sub unit was rubu  and

References

Ottoman units of measurement
Units of length
Human-based units of measurement